Akiko Omae and Peangtarn Plipuech were the defending champions, but Plipuech chose to participate in Taipei instead. Omae partnered Ksenia Lykina and successfully defended her title. Omae and Lykina won the title, defeating Rika Fujiwara and Ayaka Okuno in the final, 6–7(4–7), 6–2, [10–5].

Seeds

Draw

References 
 Draw

Dunlop World Challenge - Doubles